Chlorodiphenylphosphine is an organophosphorus compound with the formula (C6H5)2PCl, abbreviated Ph2PCl. It is a colourless oily liquid with a pungent odor that is often described as being garlic-like and detectable even in the ppb range.  It is useful reagent for introducing the Ph2P group into molecules, which includes many ligands. Like other halophosphines, Ph2PCl is reactive with many nucleophiles such as water and easily oxidized even by air.

Synthesis and reactions
Chlorodiphenylphosphine is produced on a commercial scale from benzene and phosphorus trichloride (PCl3). Benzene reacts with phosphorus trichloride at extreme temperatures around 600 °C to give dichlorophenylphosphine (PhPCl2) and HCl.  Redistribution of PhPCl2 in the gas phase at high temperatures results in chlorodiphenylphosphine.
2PhPCl2 → Ph2PCl + PCl3
Alternatively such compounds are prepared by redistribution reactions starting with  triphenylphosphine and phosphorus trichloride. 
PCl3 + 2PPh3 → 3Ph2PCl

Chlorodiphenylphosphine hydrolyzes to give diphenylphosphine oxide. Reduction with sodium affords tetraphenyldiphosphine:
2Ph2PCl + 2Na → [Ph2P]2 + 2NaCl

With ammonia and elemental sulfur, it converts to the thiophosphorylamide:
Ph2PCl + 2NH3  +  S → Ph2P(S)NH2 +  NH4Cl

Uses 
Chlorodiphenylphosphine, along with other chlorophosphines, is used in the synthesis of various phosphines.  A typical route uses Grignard reagents:
Ph2PCl + MgRX → Ph2PR + MgClX

The phosphines produced from reactions with Ph2PCl are further developed and used as pesticides (such as EPN), stabilizers for plastics (Sandostab P-EPQ), various halogen compound catalysts, flame retardants (cyclic phosphinocarboxylic anhydride), as well as UV-hardening paint systems (used in dental materials) making Ph2PCl an important intermediate in the industrial world.

Precursor to diphenylphosphido derivatives
Chlorodiphenylphosphine is used in the synthesis of sodium diphenylphosphide via its reaction with sodium metal in refluxing dioxane.
Ph2PCl + 2 Na → Ph2PNa + NaCl

Diphenylphosphine can be synthesized in the reaction of Ph2PCl and LiAlH4, the latter usually used in excess.
4 Ph2PCl + LiAlH4 → 4 Ph2PH + LiCl + AlCl3
Both Ph2PNa and Ph2PH are also used in the synthesis of organophosphine ligands.

Characterization
The quality of chlorodiphenylphosphine is often checked by 31P NMR spectroscopy.

References 

Phosphines
Phenyl compounds